Trail View State Park is a  state park located on Long Island on the Nassau–Suffolk county border in New York. The linear park, created in September 2002, runs between Bethpage State Park and Cold Spring Harbor State Park.

History
Trail View State Park occupies the former right-of-way for the proposed northern extension of the Bethpage State Parkway and Caumsett State Parkway, on land acquired by New York State in the 1960s. Formerly under the management of the New York State Department of Transportation, the parcel was opened as a state park in September 2002.

In late 2012 or early 2013, the paved, multi-use Bethpage Bikeway was extended through Trail View State Park.

Description
It contains a portion of the Nassau/Suffolk Greenbelt Trail, in addition to a portion of the Bethpage Bikeway. The park offers hiking and biking, a nature trail, a bridle path, bird watching, and cross-country skiing.

See also  
List of New York state parks

References

External links  
 New York State Parks: Trail View State Park

State parks of New York (state)
Bike paths in New York (state)
Parks in Nassau County, New York
Parks in Suffolk County, New York